Patrick Ochs (born 14 May 1984) is a German former footballer who played as a right-back or right winger. Ochs spent the majority of his professional career with Eintracht Frankfurt.

Club career
In the 2009–10 season, Eintracht Frankfurt manager Michael Skibbe switched Ochs from his usual right back position to play on the wing using his pace to give the offence a boost.

In 2015, after his contract had expired, he left VfL Wolfsburg. During his four-year spell there, he was loaned for one season to 1899 Hoffenheim. Finally he could not establish himself in Wolfsburg, during the last season he even did not earn a single cap for the first team in all competitions.

In summer 2016 Ochs joined 3. Liga side FSV Frankfurt. In April 2018, he suffered a severe knee injury tearing his cruciate ligament as well as damaging his anterior ligament and meniscus.

International career
He represented the German under-21 team at UEFA U-21 Championship 2006.

Career statistics

Honours
Eintracht Frankfurt
 DFB-Pokal Runner-up: 2005–06

VfL Wolfsburg
 DFB-Pokal: 2014–15

References

External links
  
 
 Patrick Ochs at eintracht-archiv.de 
 

1984 births
Living people
Footballers from Frankfurt
Association football fullbacks
German footballers
FC Bayern Munich II players
VfL Wolfsburg players
Eintracht Frankfurt players
TSG 1899 Hoffenheim players
FSV Frankfurt players
Germany under-21 international footballers
Bundesliga players
2. Bundesliga players
3. Liga players